The black-billed hanging parrot (Loriculus bonapartei) is a hanging parrot native to the Sulu Archipelago of the Philippines.

Description
It is 14 cm long. The front of the crown of the black-billed hanging parrot is red, turning to orange and yellow on the back of the crown. The tail is green above and blue below. Most of its feathers are bright green, its bill is black and its irises are brown.

References

Loriculus
Endemic birds of the Philippines
Fauna of Sulu
Sulu Archipelago
Birds described in 1856
Taxa named by Charles de Souancé